Zakaria Khan Chowdhury was a Bangladesh Nationalist Party politician and a Member of Parliament from Habiganj-2.

Early life 
Chowdhury was born 18 November 1933 in Assam, British India. He graduated with a B.A. in Economics from the University of Dhaka in 1955.

Career 
In 1960, Chowdhury created Purboshuri, a secret organisation, in London that would work for the Independence of Bangladesh. He protested outside the Pakistan Embassy in London over the filing of the Agartala conspiracy case. He sent Sir William Thomas Williams, QC to defend Sheikh Mujibur Rahman, with whom he had close contact, in the Agartala case. He returned to Bangladesh from London in 1972. In 1977, he became an advisor to the government of President Ziaur Rahman. He was instrumental in the formation of Bangladesh Haor and Wetland Development Board.

Chowdhury worked as an organiser during the Bangladesh Liberation war. He was the publisher of The Manobkantha.

Chowdhury was elected to parliament from Habiganj-2 as a Bangladesh Nationalist Party candidate in 15 February 1996.

Death 
Chowdhury died on 25 March 2021 at Green Life Medical College Hospital, Dhaka, Bangladesh.

References 

Bangladesh Nationalist Party politicians
2021 deaths
6th Jatiya Sangsad members
20th-century Bangladeshi economists
1933 births
University of Dhaka alumni
People from Habiganj District